The 1978 Australian Sports Car Championship was a CAMS sanctioned Australian motor racing title for Group D Production Sports Cars. The title, which was the tenth Australian Sports Car Championship, was won by Ross Mathiesen, driving a Porsche Carrera.

Calendar
The championship was contested over a four-round series.

Classes
Cars competed in two engine displacement classes.
 Up to and including 2000cc
 Over 2000cc

Points system
Championship points were awarded at each round on a 9-6-4-3-2-1 basis to the first six finishers in each class, and on a 4-3-2-1 to the first four finisher outright, irrespective of class.

At rounds which were contested over two heats, round placings were determined by allocating "points" to the first fourteen placegetters in each heat on a 20-16-13-11-10-9-8-7-6-5-4-3-2-1 basis.
Where more than one driver attained the same total, the relevant round placing was awarded to driver gaining the higher place in the last heat.
Actual championship points were then awarded based on the calculated round placings.

Championship results

References

Further reading
Jim Shepherd, Australian Sports Car Championship, 1978, A History of Australian Motor Sport, 1980, pages 178 to 179

Australian Sports Car Championship
Sports Car Championship